Baltron's Beacon is an adventure module published in 1985 for the Advanced Dungeons & Dragons fantasy role-playing game.

Plot summary
Baltron's Beacon is an adventure in which the player characters are hired to find a substance known as "black flame" in a ruined tower in a swamp.

Publication history
I7 Baltron's Beacon was written by Philip Meyers, with a cover by Larry Elmore, and was published by TSR in 1985 as a 32-page booklet with an outer folder.

Reception

Reviews

References

Dungeons & Dragons modules
Role-playing game supplements introduced in 1985